Badulla District ( badūlla distrikkaya;  Patuḷai māvaṭṭam) is a district in Uva Province, Sri Lanka. The district is bounded by the districts of Monaragala and Rathnapura on the east and south, by Ampara and Kandy districts to the north and by Nuwara Eliya and Matale to the west. Mainly the economy of the district is based on agricultural farming and livestock.

Badulla District is an agricultural district where tea and various vegetables are cultivated. The district is divided into an upper region and a lower region which differ in climatic and geographic characteristics. The upper region of the district is known for tea plantations and vegetable cultivation while the lower region focuses more on paddy farming.

Education
Saraswathy Central College
S.Thomas' College Bandarawela
St.Joseph's college
Bandarawela Central College
Dharmadutha College
UVA College
Badulla Central College
Vishaka Girls High School
Viharamahadevi Girls School
Passara National College
Passara Tamil Maha Vidyalayam National College
Sri Ramakrishna College
Al Adhan Maha Vidyalaya
Barathy Maha Vidyalayam
Tamils Girls maha vidyalayam

Electorate divisions in Badulla District
Badulla
Bandarawela
Hali-Ela
Haputale
Mahiyanganaya
Passara
Uva-Paranagama
Welimada
Wiyaluwa

Major cities

 Badulla (Municipal Council)
 Bandarawela (Municipal Council)

Major towns

 Haputale (Urban Council)

Other places
 Mahiyanganaya
 Diyatalawa
 Hali-Ela
 Ella
 Haldummulla
 Beragala
 Welimada
 Kandaketiya
 Meegahakivula
 Passara
 Lunugala
 Tennapanguwa
 Kumarapattiya

Demography

(2010 estimates 887220)

Religion

Important locations in Badulla District

 Mahiyangana Raja Maha Vihara
 Muthiyangana Raja Maha Vihara, Badulla
 Army Garrison Town, Diyatalawa
 Namunukula Mountain Range
 Lipton's Seat and Adisham Bungalow in Haputale
 Railway bridge and Railway line in Demodara
 Dunhinda, Babarakanda, Diyaluma and Ravana Ella Waterfalls
 Bogoda Wooden Bridge
 Indigenous Vedda people, Dambana

Maps 
Detailed map of Badulla vicinity and Sri Lanka

See also
History of Uva Province
Health Care of Uva Province - Provincial General Hospital - Badulla

References

External links 

 
Districts of Sri Lanka